The Republic of China (ROC) and Lithuania established diplomatic relations in 1921, three years after Lithuania's declaration of independence in 1918. The relations continued until the Soviet occupation of the Baltic states in 1940. The ROC did not recognise the Soviet annexation of Lithuania. The ROC lost the vast majority of its territory, namely mainland China, to the People's Republic of China (PRC) in 1949 (Chinese Civil War), and it has been limited to the island of Taiwan, formerly a Japanese colony and minor associated islands since the 1950s. Democratic Lithuania and modern-day ROC established unofficial diplomatic relations in 2021, thirty-one years after the restoration of Lithuania's independence in 1990.

Relations between Lithuania and Taiwan have grown closer in recent years. In 2021, Taiwan opened the "Taiwanese Representative Office in Lithuania". Meanwhile, Lithuania intends to open a representative office in Taiwan. The recent strengthening of relations between Lithuania and Taiwan in 2021 has been heavily opposed by the People's Republic of China (PRC), which doesn't recognize Taiwan. Notably, the PRC has downgraded its embassy in Lithuania to the status of a "chargé d'affaires" in protest. The PRC and Lithuania had previously maintained full diplomatic relations with one another since 1991.

History

First phase of relations (1921–2021) 

In 1921, the Republic of China (ROC) and Lithuania were relatively new countries in their then-modern forms, with Lithuania having declared independence from the then-defunct Russian Empire in 1918 (in the context of Imperial German occupation during World War I) and with the ROC having overthrown the Qing dynasty in 1912. Contemporaneously, throughout the entire Interwar period, the island of Taiwan was a Japanese dependency, having been ceded to the Empire of Japan by the Qing dynasty in 1895. Taiwan was unilaterally annexed by the ROC at the end of World War II in 1945 following Imperial Japan's surrender. Meanwhile, Lithuania was annexed by the Soviet Union (led by Soviet Russia) in 1940, near the beginning of WWII.

The ROC did not de jure recognise the Soviet occupation of Lithuania in 1940. Nonetheless, relations between the ROC and Lithuania were subsequently de facto nonexistent throughout the entire period of Soviet rule in Lithuania (1940–1990). In 1949, the ROC was overthrown by the People's Republic of China (PRC) in mainland China in the context of the Chinese Civil War, though it retained control over the island of Taiwan and minor associated islands. Aside from a few other territorial changes during the early-1950s, the ROC's territory has been limited to these aforementioned territories since then. During the post-Cold War era, the domestic political situation within the ROC has changed considerably, e.g. the Kuomintang political party no longer rules the country as a one-party state and the country now holds democratic elections in order to determine the ruling party although the ROC still maintain the claim to be the sole legitimate government of the country of "China", which includes Taiwan, mainland China and Tibet. The PRC has claimed Taiwan as its own province since 1949.

Second phase of relations (2021–present) 
In 1991, the PRC and Lithuania established diplomatic relations with one another, one year after the restoration of Lithuania's independence in 1990. Contemporaneously, Lithuania and Taiwan did not have much contact throughout the 1990s and 2000s, with Taiwan's main partner in the Baltic states being Latvia prior to 2021.

Since 2020, Lithuania–Taiwan relations have rapidly warmed, and in April of that year 200 Lithuanian politicians and public figures petitioned the President of Lithuania to support Taiwan's membership in the World Health Organization. These calls were reiterated by the then-foreign minister, Linas Linkevičius, in a direct phone call with the head of the WHO. On 19 June 2020, Taiwanese representative to the Baltic states Andy Chin spoke in the Seimas at the invitation of the opposition Homeland Union, inviting objection from China and marking the highest platform any Taiwanese official had achieved in the Baltic states.

Lithuania's Freedom Party platform has a clause supporting full recognition of the independence of Taiwan (ROC), and in the 2020 Lithuanian parliamentary election, parties sympathetic to Taiwan such as the Homeland Union and Freedom Party entered government and formed a coalition. In 2021, the Lithuania-Taiwan Forum was established by over 50 Lithuanian political figures, most notably Mantas Adomėnas and Gintaras Steponavičius, and it was announced that Lithuania would open a trade office in Taiwan amidst growing discontent with China's "17 + 1" program.

In October 2021, Lithuania's parliament passed a legislative revision that gave the green light to the country to open a representative office in Taiwan. On 18 November 2021, Taiwan opened its de facto embassy, the Taiwanese Representative Office in Lithuania, in Vilnius.  The naming of this office was notable for its use of "Taiwan" in the title rather than Taipei, though Lithuanian officials confirmed that the office would not have diplomatic status and the name would not imply recognition of statehood, and have maintained that it was not in breach of their 1991 recognition of the PRC's One China principle during their establishment of diplomatic relations in 1991. However, Beijing disagreed and recalled their ambassador from Vilnius and expelled the Lithuanian ambassador in Beijing. In early January 2022, The Taiwanese Representative Office in Vilnius announced that the Taiwanese government was planning to invest $200 million (USD) into Lithuania's industry and technology sectors later in the year.

In August 2022, the Deputy Minister for Transport and Communications Agnė Vaiciukevičiūtė made a 4-day visit to Taiwan in company with officials of the electro bus market in Lithuania. During the visit she also met Foreign Minister Jaushieh Joseph Wu. After the visit concluded, China imposed sanctions on Vaiciukevičiūtė.

Trade and cultural cooperation 

Taipei and Vilnius established sister city status on 28 May 1998.

In 2020, Lithuania exported $37.8 million (USD) to Taiwan or 0.07%, and imported $97.3 million, or 0.23%. Lithuanian exports were predominantly tobacco, chemicals, furniture and wood, while Taiwanese exports were mainly in the tech and machinery sector.

In September 2021, Taiwanese official statistics showed that 112,000 credit card transactions from Taiwanese at Lithuanian businesses with a total volume of $86 million (USD), and the Bank of Lithuania observed an increase of 56% from the period from the previous year.

Aid
Taiwan donated 100,000 face masks to Lithuania early during the COVID-19 pandemic.  In 2021, Lithuania donated 20,000 and then a further 235,900 doses of the AstraZeneca COVID-19 vaccine to Taiwan. Taiwanese food giant I-Mei Foods donated over 21,000 of its signature puff cookies to Lithuania in gratitude.

See also
 Foreign relations of Lithuania
 Foreign relations of Taiwan
 Government of the Republic of China
 Latvia–Taiwan relations
 China–Lithuania relations
Taiwanese Representative Office in Lithuania

References

 
Foreign relations of Lithuania
Foreign relations of Taiwan